Raymond Kelly or Ray Kelly may  refer to:

Sportspeople
Ray Kelly (footballer) (born 1976), Irish soccer striker
Ray Kelly (referee), Irish Gaelic games match official
Ray Kelly (rugby league), Australian rugby league footballer
Ray Kelly (sportswriter) (1914–1988), American journalist for Philadelphia Evening Bulletin

Other
Raymond Kelly (born 1941), American law enforcement; former New York City Police Commissioner
Raymond C. Kelly (born 1942), American cultural anthropologist, ethnologist, and academic
Ray Kelly (EastEnders), fictional character introduced in 2018
Thomas Kelly (GC) (Thomas Raymond Kelly, 1928–1947), British Merchant Navy seaman posthumously awarded the George Cross
Ray "Gunner" Kelly (1906–1977), Australian police officer
Raymond Kelley, American cellist
Ray Kelly (singer), Irish singing priest

See also
Kelly (disambiguation)